Han Dayuan (Chinese: 韓大元; Pinyin: Hán Dàyuán, born October 1960) is Professor of Constitutional Law and the Dean of Renmin University of China Law School. He is also the President of the Chinese Constitutional Law Society.

Biography 
Han Dayuan was born in a Korean family in Jilin, China.  He received his LL.B degree from Jilin University in 1984, and his LL.M degree from Renmin University of China Law School in 1987, after which he joined the faculty of Renmin University Law School.  In 1994 he received his LL.D from Renmin University. From 1990 to 1991, he was visiting scholar at Kyoto University. In 2001, he was visiting scholar at Harvard Law School.

Han was selected to be one of the Ten Outstanding Young Jurists by China Law Society in 1999. In 2005, he was elected as one of Distinguished Contemporary Chinese Jurists.

In October 2007, he was elected President of the Chinese Constitutional Law Society.  Han was appointed Dean of Renmin University of China Law School in April 2009.

Views 
In February 2012, Han suggested in an article published in The Legal Daily, that China's Draft Criminal Procedure Law (CPL) Amendments be further amended to substitute the words, "to punish crime [and] to protect the people" to "...to protect human rights."

In February 2021, Han said that the 2019-20 Hong Kong protests happened because the government failed to ensure that only "patriots" ran the city. Regarding "patriots," Han also claimed that "elections... must ensure patriots are elected into governance, must ensure the HKSAR regime's security, to prevent significant risks to national security."

References

External links 
 Introduction to Han Dayuan

1960 births
Chinese legal scholars
Harvard University staff
Renmin University of China alumni
Academic staff of Renmin University of China
Living people
Chinese people of Korean descent
Jilin University alumni